Chen Zhongliu (born 30 September 1993 in Duyun) is a Chinese football player who currently plays for Chinese Super League side Cangzhou Mighty Lions. He is of the Dong Chinese ethnic minority.

Club career
Chen joined Hangzhou Greentown youth team system from Shenzhen Yantian Sports School in 2006. In 2011, he was loaned to China League Two club Wenzhou Provenza for one year. Chen played 16 times in the 2011 league season. He was promoted to Hangzhou Greentown's first team squad by Takeshi Okada in 2012. Okada described Chen as a high potential player, and he said that even in Japan or Netherlands, it's hard to find a player at Chen's age could play as good as Chen did. 

On 11 March 2012, Chen made his Super League debut in the first round of the season which Hangzhou Greentown played against Qingdao Jonoon. However, after he was late for training for three times, Chen was sent to the U19 team by Okada in April. Chen returned to the first team in June and played in the third round of the 2012 Chinese FA Cup, in which Hangzhou Greentown beat Shanghai Tellace 3-0 on 26 June.

In February 2018, Chen transferred to Chinese Super League side Chongqing Dangdai Lifan. He would not play for Chongqing in his debut season and was moved to the reserve squad in the following season before joining second tier club Suzhou Dongwu on 9 September 2020.

International career
Chen was first called up for China U-20 by Jan Olde Riekerink in July 2011. He scored two goals in four appearances in 2012 AFC U-19 Championship qualification as China U-20 managed to qualify into the 2012 AFC U-19 Championship. On 10 January 2017, Chen made his debut for the Chinese national team in the 2017 China Cup against Iceland, coming on as a substitution for Yin Hongbo in the 57th minute.

Career statistics 
Statistics accurate as of match played 31 December 2020.

References

External links
 
 

1993 births
Living people
Association football midfielders
Chinese footballers
Footballers from Guizhou
Zhejiang Professional F.C. players
Chongqing Liangjiang Athletic F.C. players
Suzhou Dongwu F.C. players
People from Qiannan
Chinese Super League players
China League One players
China League Two players
China international footballers
Kam people